Armillaria fumosa is a species of mushroom in the family Physalacriaceae. This species is found in Australia.

See also 
 List of Armillaria species

References 

fumosa
Fungal tree pathogens and diseases
Fungi of Australia
Fungi described in 1983
Taxa named by Roy Watling